Atelier 17 was an art school and studio that was influential in the teaching and promotion of printmaking in the 20th century. Originally located in Paris, the studio relocated to New York during the years surrounding World War II. It moved back to Paris in 1950.

History
The Atelier 17 studio was formed as an experimental workshop for the graphic arts in Paris, France in 1927 by Stanley William Hayter (1901–1988). The studio was known for its collaborative atmosphere, with artists sharing ideas on technique and aesthetics.

The studio was located at 17 rue Campagne-Première in Paris. By 1940 the studio's founder, Hayter, left Paris as World War II was starting. He moved to New York City and reopened his Atelier 17 studio there. Originally connected to the New School, by 1945 the studio was located as East 8th Street. The studio attracted many European artists who had fled from Europe and also introduced American artists to fine art printmaking.

Hayter ran the workshop with the expectation that all the artists working there would learn from each other and become proficient in all aspects of intaglio printing. The Atelier brought together Americans with artists that had fled Europe to New York. 

Hayter moved his studio back to Paris in 1950 where it continued to operate until Hayter's death in 1988. That year the studio was renamed Atelier Contrepoint and remains active.

Techniques
Atelier 17 artists worked with established and experimental techniques including multi-color printing and textured patterns. Among the techniques used were aquatint, color offset printing, etching, the Grible Method, liftground, line engraving, and mezzotint.

The Atelier 17 studio created the earliest examples of viscosity printing and is credited with inventing the process.

Artists associated with Atelier 17
The catalogue for the Atelier 17 50th anniversary retrospective includes the names of artists who worked at Atelier 17.

Paris (1927-1939)

New York (1940-1955)

Legacy
Atelier 17 and artists associated with it have been the subject of several comprehensive exhibitions, notably Atelier 17: a 50th anniversary retrospective exhibition at the Elvehjem Art Center of the University of Wisconsin in 1977, Atelier 17 at the Brooklyn Museum in 1978, Workshop and Legacy: Stanley William Hayter, Krishna Reddy, Zarina Hashmi at the Metropolitan Museum of Art in 2016, and Cutting Edge:Modern Prints from Atelier 17 at the Cleveland Museum of Art.

References

Further reading
"Atelier 17" by Leo Katz
The Women of Atelier 17:Modernist Printmaking in Midcentury New York by Christina Weyl, 2019, Yale University Press 

Art schools in Paris
Art schools in New York City
1927 establishments in France
Educational institutions established in 1927
1988 disestablishments in France
Educational institutions disestablished in 1988
Visual arts education
Printmaking groups and organizations